Samuel Morgan Shortridge (August 3, 1861January 15, 1952) was a Republican Senator from California.

Early years 
He was born in Mount Pleasant, Iowa and moved to California as a child with his family, which settled in San Jose in 1875. He practiced law in San Francisco, California for most of his life.

Career 
Shortbridge was a presidential elector in 1888, 1900, and 1908. He lost the 1914 U.S. Senate Republican primary to veteran congressman Joseph R. Knowland, who was defeated in the general election by James D. Phelan. Shortridge was elected to the U.S. Senate in 1920, riding Warren G. Harding's post World War I "Return to Normalcy" campaign. Defeating Phelan and strong candidates from the Prohibition Party and Socialist Party of America, Shortridge won the general election with 49% of the vote. He was reelected in 1926 with 63% of the vote over Democrat John B. Elliott. He served two full terms before being defeated in a primary in 1932.

Shortridge became a prominent voice for racist anti-Japanese forces in California, declaring that a child of Japanese immigrants would regard "himself or herself as a native of Japan. His heart, his affections go out to the native land of the parent.". Shortridge's claims in 1924 were remarkably similar to some of the justifications made for Japanese internment during World War II. Even some senators who wanted to favor northern and western European immigrants found Shortridge's anti-Japanese position unnecessary.

Shortridge served as a special attorney for the Justice Department in Washington, D.C. from 1939 to 1943.

Family 
His sister, Clara S. Foltz, became the first female lawyer in California in 1878, and first female deputy district attorney in the US in 1910. She helped him campaign for the Senate.

His brother Charles M. Shortridge (1858-1918) was the owner of the San Jose newspaper Daily Mercury and purchased The San Francisco Call in 1895.

He was part of the Bohemian Club. (Varied Types by Edward F O'Day)

Death 
He died in Atherton, California, and was buried in Oak Hill Cemetery in San Jose.

References

External links 

 
 
 

1861 births
1952 deaths
California Republicans
Politicians from San Francisco
Republican Party United States senators from California
Lawyers from San Francisco
Burials at Oak Hill Memorial Park
1888 United States presidential electors
1900 United States presidential electors
1908 United States presidential electors